Media source or MediaSource may refer to:

 Mass media, media used by the public as sources of information and entertainment
 Source (journalism), an entity used as source of information
 Media Source Inc. ( MSI Information Services), American publishing company
 Media Source Extensions (MSE), a W3C specification for using delivering digital media
 Media server, a device or application that makes digital media available over a network